Zalipie may refer to the following villages in Poland:
Zalipie in Lubań County, Lower Silesian Voivodeship (SW Poland)
Zalipie, Lesser Poland Voivodeship (S Poland)